Monkspath Meadow is a  ancient hay-meadow and a biological site of Special Scientific Interest in the West Midlands. The site was notified in 1986 under the Wildlife and Countryside Act 1981. It is on the south-eastern edge of Monkspath. The site has recently been targeted for development for houses but these plans have been met with uproar from locals in Monkspath and nearby villages, such as Cheswick Green and Hockley Heath, as it would destroy such a special natural site.

The site has probably been used as a hay meadow for over 800 years, and has not been ploughed for at least 200 years. It was originally at risk of development from the construction of a new local supermarket and garden centre in 1986. A little over half of the site was saved from development by a campaign led by Members of Warwickshire Nature Conservation Trust when proposals for the new supermarket were outlined.

Neither site is now accessible to the general public and The Warwickshire Wildlife Trust take no interest in either site having now removed it from their nature conservation handbook as one of their nature reserves.

Today Notcutts Garden Centre manages the site under the direction of English Nature. The meadow supports a diverse level of flora with over 150 recorded species, including various grass species such as common bent (Agrostis capillaris), red fescue (Festuca rubra), Yorkshire fog (Holcus lanatus) and tufted hair-grass (Deschampsia cespitosa). Herbs include cowslip (Primula veris), betony (Stachys officinalis), great burnet (Sanguisorba officinalis), dyer's greenweed (Genista tinctoria), meadow thistle (Cirsium dissectum), saw-wort (Serratula tinctoria), heath grass (Danthonia decumbens), heath spotted orchid (Dactylorhiza maculata), and common spotted orchid (Dactylorhiza maculata). Fauna includes for small heath (Coenonympha pamphilus), meadow brown (Maniola jurtina) and common blue (Polyommatus icarus) butterflies.

.

See also
List of Sites of Special Scientific Interest in the West Midlands
Ragged Robins Nature Notes: webpage for Monkspath meadow

References

Sites of Special Scientific Interest notified in 1986
Sites of Special Scientific Interest in the West Midlands (county)
Meadows in the West Midlands